Coronda Peak is a peak over  high, standing north of Leith Harbour on the north coast of South Georgia. The name appears on a chart showing the results of surveys by Discovery Investigations personnel in 1927 and 1929, and is probably after the SS Coronda whose captain was of assistance to the survey party.

References
 

Mountains and hills of South Georgia